Always is a 1986 song released by James Ingram, A Track Off His Album, Never Felt So Good, on the Qwest Label.  And It Became A Top 30 R&B Hit In America.

Personnel
Vocals & Backing Vocals: James Ingram
Drums, Bass, Keyboards, Synthesizer [Farlight CMI]: Keith Diamond
Synthesizer [Fairlight CMI]: Ned Liben
Guitars: Clarence Brice
Backing Vocals: Eldra DeBarge, Howard Hewett, David Pack

1986 songs
Songs written by Keith Diamond (songwriter)
Songs written by James Ingram